Planococcus may refer to:
 Planococcus (bug), a genus of bugs in the family Pseudococcidae
 Planococcus (bacterium), a genus of bacteria in the family Planococcaceae